Holly Tree may refer to:

the plant Holly
the restaurant chain Holly Tree Inn